Akshobhya Tirtha ( 1282-  1365) was a Dvaita philosopher, scholar and theologian. Born as Govinda Bhatta, he received sannyasa from Padmanabha Tirtha and later succeeded Madhava Tirtha as the pontiff of the Madhvacharya peetha from (1350 - 1365).  A non-extant work titled Madhva Tantra Samgraha is attributed to him.  Sharma contends that Akshobhya retired to Pandharapur in his twilight years where he encountered a youth called Dhondu Pant on the banks of Bhima river, who would later go on to be his disciple and successor, Jayatirtha.  His mortal remains rest at Malkhed.

He holds the distinction of defeating the celebrated Mayavadin of Sringeri Peetha , Sri Vidyaranya in a historic debate of the interpretation of the shruti-passage Tat-tvam-Asi. This incident is recorded by Sri Vaishnava biographers of Sri Vedanta Desikar - the celebrated Sri Vaishnava theologian. The verdict was in favor of Sri Akshobhya Tirtha, as pronounced by Sri Vedanta Desikar. A portion of what was told is re-produced below according to the Vedanta Desika Vaibhava Prakashika by Cholanaraimhapuram Chandamaaruta Doddacharyariar 

attvamasinA asinA tam vidyAraNyam muni: tadA akshobhya: |  acchinadityavadadya: tam seve tattvanirNaye caturam ||
"I serve the wise person who is clever at judging and refereeing the debate on philosophy  who  declared  that  then  Akshobhya  muni  wielding  the  sword  of  "tattvamasi" cut VidyAraNya's jungle of philosophy into pieces". .

Sri Akshobhya Tirtha installed the idol of Sri Narasimha in Mulbagal . There are 2 Mutts started by his followers - one at Kudli and the other at Balagaru.

References

Bibliography

External links
 Akshobhya Tirtha on Uttaradi Matha

Madhva religious leaders
Dvaita Vedanta
Dvaitin philosophers
Scholars from Karnataka
Uttaradi Math
History of Karnataka
14th-century Indian philosophers